The Central District of Shahin Shahr and Meymeh County is a district (bakhsh) in Shahin Shahr and Meymeh County, Isfahan Province, Iran. At the 2006 census, its population was 160,903, in 43,078 families.  The District has three cities: Shahin Shahr, Gaz & Gorgab. The District has two rural districts (dehestan): Borkhar-e Gharbi Rural District and Murcheh Khvort Rural District.

References 

Shahin Shahr and Meymeh County
Districts of Isfahan Province